Emmet Bolton (born 30 November 1985) is a Gaelic footballer from County Kildare. He plays for the Kildare senior inter-county football team. He was named in the 2010 Opel GPA Team of the Year, and in 2011 he was nominated for an All Stars Award.
      
In 2011, Bolton was part of the Ireland team that won the 2011 International Rules Series against Australia by 130 to 65.

References

1985 births
Living people
Irish international rules football players
Kildare inter-county Gaelic footballers